The men's speed slalom event at the 2017 Summer Universiade was held on 25 August at the Yingfeng Riverside Park Roller Sports Rink (A).

Results

Preliminary Round

Semifinals

References 

Roller sports at the 2017 Summer Universiade